Pena is a census-designated place (CDP) in Starr County, Texas, United States. It is a new CDP formed from part of the North Escobares CDP prior to the 2010 census with a population of 118.

Geography
Pena is located at  (26.415513, -98.969979).

Education
It is in the Roma Independent School District. The zoned elementary school is Veterans Memorial Elementary School. Roma High School is the district's sole comprehensive high school.

References

Census-designated places in Starr County, Texas
Census-designated places in Texas